Günter Hotz (born 16 November 1931) is a German pioneer of computer science. His work includes formal languages, digital circuits
and computational complexity theory. In 1987, he received the Gottfried Wilhelm Leibniz Prize of the Deutsche Forschungsgemeinschaft, which is the highest honour awarded in German research.  In 1999 he was awarded the Konrad Zuse Medal of the Gesellschaft für Informatik.

Hotz received his PhD in 1958 at Göttingen.  His advisor was Kurt Reidemeister.

References

External links
 Personal web page 

1931 births
Living people
German computer scientists
20th-century German mathematicians
Gottfried Wilhelm Leibniz Prize winners
Commanders Crosses of the Order of Merit of the Federal Republic of Germany
Recipients of the Saarland Order of Merit
Members of the German Academy of Sciences at Berlin
Presidents of the German Informatics Society